Río Cuarto Department is a  department of Córdoba Province in Argentina.

The provincial subdivision has a population of about 229,728 inhabitants in an area of 18,394 km², and its capital city is Río Cuarto, which is located around 608 km from Capital Federal.

Settlements
Achiras
Adelia María
Alcira Gigena
Alpa Corral
Berrotarán
Bulnes
Chaján
Chucul
Coronel Baigorria
Coronel Moldes
Elena
La Carolina
La Cautiva
Las Acequias
Las Albahacas
Las Higueras
Las Peñas Sud
Las Vertientes
Malena
Monte de Los Gauchos
Río Cuarto
Sampacho
San Basilio
Santa Catalina
Suco
Tosquita
Vicuña Mackenna
Villa El Chacay
Washington

External links

1888 establishments in Argentina
Departments of Córdoba Province, Argentina